According to the Book of Judges, Deborah (Dəḇōrā, "bee") was a prophetess of the God of the Israelites, the fourth Judge of pre-monarchic Israel and the only female judge mentioned in the Bible. Many scholars contend that the phrase, "a woman of Lappidot", as translated from biblical Hebrew in Judges 4:4 denotes her marital status as the wife of Lappidot. Alternatively, "lappid" translates as "torch" or "lightning", therefore the phrase, "woman of Lappidot" could be referencing Deborah as a "fiery woman."  Deborah told Barak, an Israelite general from Kedesh in Naphtali, that God commanded him to lead an attack against the forces of Jabin king of Canaan and his military commander Sisera (Judges 4:6–7); the entire narrative is recounted in chapter 4.

Judges chapter 5 gives the same story in poetic form. This passage, often called The Song of Deborah, may date to as early as the twelfth century BC, and is perhaps the earliest sample of Hebrew poetry.

Bible narrative 

In the Book of Judges, it is stated that Deborah was a prophet, a judge of Israel and the wife of Lapidoth. She rendered her judgments beneath a date palm tree between Ramah in Benjamin and Bethel in the land of Ephraim.

The people of Israel had been oppressed by Jabin, the king of Canaan, whose capital was Hazor, for twenty years. Stirred by the wretched condition of Israel she sends a message to Barak, the son of Abinoam, at Kedesh of Naphtali, and tells him that the Lord God had commanded him to muster ten thousand troops of Naphtali and Zebulun and concentrate them upon Mount Tabor, the mountain at the northern angle of the great plain of Esdraelon. At the same time she states that the Lord God of Israel will draw Sisera, commander of Jabin's army, to the River Kishon. Barak declines to go without the prophet. Deborah consents, but declares that the glory of the victory will therefore belong to a woman. As soon as the news of the rebellion reaches Sisera, he collects nine hundred chariots of iron and a host of people.

Then Deborah said, according to :

As Deborah prophesied, a battle is fought (led by Barak), and Sisera is completely defeated.  He escapes on foot while his army is pursued as far as Harosheth Haggoyim and destroyed. Sisera comes to the tent of Jael and lies down to rest. He asks for a drink, she gives him milk and while he is asleep she hammers a tent-pin through his temple.

The Biblical account of Deborah ends with the statement that after the battle, there was peace in the land for 40 years.

The Song of Deborah 

The Song of Deborah is found in Judges 5:2–31 and is a victory hymn, sung by Deborah and Barak, about the defeat of Canaanite adversaries by some of the tribes of Israel. Biblical scholars generally identified the Song as one of the oldest parts of the Bible, dating somewhere in the 12th century BC, based on its grammar and context. However, some critics have recently argued that the song's language and content indicate that it was written no earlier than the 7th century BC. The song itself differs slightly from the events described in Judges 4. The song mentions six participating tribes (Ephraim, Benjamin, Machir (son of Manasseh), Zebulun, Issachar, and Naphtali) as opposed to the two tribes in Judges 4:6 (Naphtali and Zebulun) and does not mention the role of Jabin.

Though it is not uncommon to read a victory hymn in the Hebrew Bible, the Song of Deborah stands out as unique in that it is a hymn that celebrates a military victory of two women: Deborah, the prophetess and Jael, the warrior. Michael Coogan writes that Jael being a woman "is a further sign that Yahweh ultimately is responsible for the victory: the mighty Canaanite general Sisera will be 'sold' by the Lord 'into the hand of a woman (Judges 4:9).

Traditional chronology
Traditional Jewish chronology places Deborah's 40 years of judging Israel from 1107 BC until her death in 1067 BC. The Dictionary of World Biography: The Ancient World claims that she might have lived in the period between 1200 BC to 1124 BC. Based on archaeological findings, different biblical scholars have argued that Deborah's war with Sisera best fits the context of either the second half of the 12th century BC or the second half of the 11th century BC.

Gallery

See also 
 Battle of Mount Tabor (biblical)
 The Deborah number
 Handel's Deborah (Handel)

References

Further reading

External links 

 Book of Judges article, Jewish Encyclopedia
 Debbora, Catholic Encyclopedia
 Biblical Hebrew Poetry - Reconstructing the Original Oral, Aural and Visual Experience
 Song of Deborah (Judges 5) Reconstructed

12th-century BC biblical rulers
12th-century BC women rulers
12th-century BCE Hebrew people
Biblical women in ancient warfare
Judges of ancient Israel
Women in the Hebrew Bible